Breuners Home Furnishings was a chain of furniture stores in Southwestern United States for 148 years before declaring bankruptcy in 2004.

Founded in California during the California Gold Rush in the mid-19th century, its stores served California and Nevada before expanding to the east coast in the late 20th century. In 2004 the company declared bankruptcy, closed all its retail stores.  For a time it had been a virtual brand on the Internet until it too went defunct.

History

The store was founded in 1856 by William Robert “Bill” Breuner’s great-grandfather John Breuner (1828–1890) to cater to prospectors during the California Gold Rush. The first store opened in Sacramento, California with subsequent branches in Oakland, San Francisco and later throughout California and Nevada. The company went public in 1968 under Bill Breuner. Breuner sold the company in the 1970s and it was acquired by Marshall Fields in 1983. At its height Breuners operated 40 retail outlets. By the 1990s the company was based in San Diego and in 1995 expanded into the New York and New Jersey markets by acquiring Huffman Koos’ 13 stores for 36.9 million dollars. Breuners also owned Good’s Furniture stores. Private investment company Oak Point Partners acquired the remnant assets, consisting of any known and unknown assets that weren't previously administered, from the Breuners Home Furnishings Corp., et al., Bankruptcy Estates on November 13, 2012.

Legacy
Breuner Marsh, a wetlands area, and Breuner Field, a model airplane field within it, in addition to the Breuner Building in downtown Oakland, are all named after the family.

Slogans

That's the beauty of Breuners!
I've been to Breuners, and now I've seen everything!
You Breuners it, you bought it!

See also
Levitz Furniture, a company with a similar history
Montgomery Ward, a now online only, defunct department store chain
McCreery's Home Furnishings, a fine furniture store serving Since 1955 in Sacramento, CA

References

Defunct department stores based in Sacramento
Defunct furniture manufacturers
Retail companies based in California
American companies established in 1856
Retail companies established in 1856
Retail companies disestablished in 2004
1856 establishments in California
2004 disestablishments in California
California Gold Rush
Defunct companies based in the San Francisco Bay Area
Defunct department stores based in San Diego
Defunct manufacturing companies based in California